Union Lake is a lake in Rice County, in the U.S. state of Minnesota.

Union Lake was so named for the fact two streams flow into the lake where their waters are "united".

See also
List of lakes in Minnesota

References

Lakes of Minnesota
Lakes of Rice County, Minnesota